The 2010 Calgary Stampeders season was the 53rd season for the team in the Canadian Football League and their 72nd overall. The Stampeders finished in 1st place in the West Division with a 13–5 record. They attempted to win their 7th Grey Cup championship, but they lost in the West Final.

Offseason

CFL draft

Preseason

Regular season

Season standings

Season schedule

Roster

Player stats

Passing

Rushing

Receiving

Awards and records
CFL's Most Outstanding Player Award – Henry Burris (QB)
CFL's Most Outstanding Offensive Lineman Award – Ben Archibald (OT)
Tom Pate Memorial Award – Wes Lysack (DB)

2010 CFL All-Stars
CB – Dwight Anderson
OT – Ben Archibald
CB – Brandon Browner
QB – Henry Burris
SB – Nik Lewis
LB – Juwan Simpson
OG – Dimitri Tsoumpas

CFL Western All-Stars
CB – Dwight Anderson
OT – Ben Archibald
CB – Brandon Browner
WR – Romby Bryant
QB – Henry Burris
DT – DeVone Claybrooks
P – Burke Dales
DE – Charleston Hughes
DT – Tom Johnson
SB – Nik Lewis
RB – Joffrey Reynolds
LB – Juwan Simpson
OG – Dimitri Tsoumpas

Milestones
On July 1, Joffrey Reynolds set a Calgary Stampeders' record with his 29th 100-yard rushing game, surpassing Earl Lunsford who had 28.
On Sept 10, Joffrey Reynolds became the Calgary Stampeders' all-time leader in rushing yards, surpassing Kelvin Anderson's record of 8,292 yards.

Playoffs

Schedule

Bracket

West Final

References

Calgary Stampeders seasons
Calgary Stampeders Season, 2010
2010 in Alberta